The China Hustle is a 2017 finance documentary produced by Magnolia Pictures and directed by Jed Rothstein. The documentary reveals systematic and formulaic decades-long securities fraud by Chinese companies listed on the US stock market.

Many of the film's protagonists such as Dan David and Jon Carnes are activist shareholders and due diligence professionals who discovered the frauds, including fabricated accounting and brazen misrepresentations, and subsequently shorted the stock in order to bring about the collapse of the entities which often led to class action lawsuits, NASDAQ delistment, and SEC deregistration.

Synopsis
After the financial crisis of 2007–2008, as investment firms in the United States look for ways to improve clients' investment performance while earning money for themselves, they chance upon the idea of selling opportunities to unsuspecting Americans who want to get rich by participating in the "China growth story" but do not know much about the country or its companies. They do so by getting small nondescript Chinese companies (like Orient Paper and Advanced Battery Technologies (ABAT)) to do reverse mergers with defunct American companies (like Buffalo Mining) and thus get listed in the NYSE overnight. The hype that accompanies this is aided by paid guest appearances by the likes of Bill Clinton and Henry Kissinger at so called "investment conferences" organized by B level investment firms (Roth Capital is one such firm featured in the documentary), thus adding a garb of respectability and reliability. The stocks of these companies see spikes, investment firms goad their investors into buying them, siphoning off brokerages on the way. When the prices of these stocks crash to their real value, unsuspecting savers are left holding large amounts of worthless stock in their 401(k)s.

The documentary investigates the collusion that occurred from 2008 to 2016 between second and third-tier US-based Wall Street investment firms such as Roth Capital Partners and small companies based in China. Most of the companies featured in the film were listed in NYSE through reverse mergers. The film reveals that the actual revenues of Chinese firms (reflected in their filings with Chinese government entities) were typically one-tenth of what was filed with the SEC. Subsequent to investigations, most of the firms were de-listed from the NYSE resulting in losses of billions of dollars to US investors.

Information on the frauds was published in Chinese newspapers in 2010 including the online edition of Sina, but American investors were unaware of these as the articles were mostly in Chinese. Subsequently, the small research and investment firm Muddy Waters published translations of the Sina reports but they did not receive much attention.

The film concludes with a closing sequence that highlights the continued lack of regulatory oversight in Chinese securities fraud. Out of approximately 400 Chinese companies, only one CEO went to jail for fraudulent reverse mergers. The film also suggests that Alibaba Group's and other existing Chinese firms'  claims of high growth rates might be just as fraudulent.

Interviews
The documentary features interviews with investment bankers, whistleblowers like Dan David, who after reading reports by the due diligence firm Muddy Waters Research decided to short many hyped up penny stocks based in China. It also features interviews with journalists from Wall Street Journal and New York Times, Mitchell Nussbaum, the lawyer from Loeb & Loeb who represented the Chinese firms featured in the film, the investment banker who sold shares and issued "buy" recommendations on these stocks to his clients, retired U.S. Army General Wesley Clark, who was chairman of Rodman & Renshaw, another firm selling these stocks, and Paul Gills (a professor at Peking University). The documentary shows the issues that crop up when large accounting firms like KPMG and Price Waterhouse Coopers sign off audit reports done by their affiliates in China, which may not have completely been verified, but is the system that is followed by all large accounting firms across the world.

Reception
The film premiered in 2017 at the Toronto Film Fest and was released on DVD and shown at the International Finance Centre in Hong Kong in April 2018.

Rotten Tomatoes gives the film rating of 74% based on reviews from 27 critics. Mark Hughes, a contributor at Forbes called it "the most important film of the year".

References

American business films
American documentary films
Documentary films about business
2017 documentary films
China–United States relations
2017 films
Documentary films about China
Films directed by Jed Rothstein
2010s English-language films
2010s American films